Janice Margaret Morse (née Hambleton, born 15 December 1945)in Blackburn, Lancs., UK to New Zealand parents. She is an anthropologist and nurse researcher who is best known as the founder and chief proponent of the field of qualitative health research. She has taught in the United States and Canada. She received PhDs in transcultural nursing and in anthropology at the University of Utah, where she later held the Ida May “Dotty” Barnes and D Keith Barnes Presidential Endowed Chair in the College of Nursing at University of Utah,. She is also an Emerita Distinguished Professor at the University of Utah and Professor Emerita at the University of Alberta. She is founder of three journals and created four scholarly book series on qualitative research. She was Founding Director of the International Institute of  Qualitative Methodology at University of Alberta, the longest standing research institute on qualitative inquiry in the world.

Early life and education 

Morse grew up in Greymouth, New Zealand in the South Island. Morse received her RN at Grey Hospital School of Nursing and practiced nursing at Royal Victoria Infirmary in Newcastle upon Tyne, UK and Hutt Hospital in New Zealand before moving to the US. She received a BA in nursing and MA in transcultural nursing from Pennsylvania State University. At the University of Utah, she was awarded an MA in physical anthropology in 1978, then simultaneous PhDs in anthropology (physical) and nursing (transcultural) in 1981. Her two dissertations dealt with cultural coping mechanisms for reducing childbirth pain, and infant feeding and health of neonates among the people of Fiji.

Professional career 

Morse began her academic career at the University of Alberta, where she advanced from an associate professor and clinical researcher to full professor by 1986. In 1996, after a five-year stint as professor at Pennsylvania State University School of Nursing, she returned to University of Alberta, where she served as professor and launched the International Institute of Qualitative Methodology in the Faculty of Nursing in 1998. She  was awarded emerita status at Alberta in 2007 when she moved to University of Utah. She was made a Distinguished Professor at University of Utah in 2019.

Qualitative health research 

With a dual background in health care and in anthropology, Morse launched the field of qualitative health research, the practice of using qualitative research methods to study health care and health settings. Her major intellectual contributions in this area include developing theorical coalescence, criteria for rigor, and generalizability for qualitative studies. These topics challenged the long-standing tradition in health and medical fields, which focused on clinical trials and analysis of statistical data.  She is also regarded as one of the founders of mixed method research, insisting that mixed methods fully engage qualitative methodologies into the study.

Morse established the major professional and scholarly infrastructure items that  support qualitative health research. In 1991, she convened the first international conference on the topic in  Edmonton. After organizing three subsequent qualitative health research conferences, she launched the International Institute for Qualitative Methodology (IIQM) at University of Alberta. Morse founded the first journal in the field, Qualitative Health Research (Sage 1991) and has edited it since its inception. She retired as Editor-in-Chief in 2021. She also founded and served as Editor, two additional journals, International Journal of Qualitative Methodology (2001),  an open access digital publication that welcomed submissions in any language and provided translation services for them,  and Global Qualitative Nursing Research (2014).
 
With her departure from Alberta for Utah in 2007, Morse launched an international organization,  Global Congress for Qualitative Health Research, which hosts an annual international conferences.

International Institute of Qualitative Methodology 

As founder, director, and later scientific director of the institute, Morse launched numerous initiatives to aid the development of qualitative methodology. IIQM ran two conferences and a week of workshops each year, attracting thousands of scholars from around the world. In addition to the journals, Qual Press was launched to publish original research and produced 11 volumes. It was later distributed by Left Coast Press  and now by Routledge.  Recognizing the importance of internationalizing the practice of qualitative research, Morse created a network of over 100 corresponding sites in 30 countries. Researchers from corresponding sites came as visiting scholars to Alberta to improve their research skills and Alberta researchers were sent around the world to help teach qualitative methodology in other countries.

Nursing research 

Morse's main contribution in nursing research relates to understanding and controlling patient falls. With Robert Morse, she created the Morse Fall Scale, a six-point scale to predict a patient's risk of falling. She identified methods of fall interventions, and the provision of safe care with the removal of patient restraints. Morse has also published extensively on patient comfort, nonpharmaceutical means of reducing patient suffering, menarche, breast feeding,  nurse-patient interactions, and on broader issues of  transcultural nursing. She developed nursing concepts and advanced methods of concept analysis. She developed mid-range theories in hope, suffering, comfort and comforting, and other clinical nursing research methods.

Publications and editorial roles 

Nursing Research: The application of qualitative approaches (with P.A. Field) 1985, Aspen; 2nd ed, 1990, Chapman & Hall; 3rd edition, 1995, Sage; 4th edition, 2000, Nelson Thornes.
Qualitative Nursing Research: A Contemporary Dialogue (editor), 1989, Sage, winner of American Journal of Nursing Book of the Year Award
Critical Issues in Qualitative Research Methods (editor), 1994, Sage, winner of American Journal of Nursing Book of the Year Award.
Preventing Patient Falls, 1997, Sage; 2nd edition, 2009, Springer
Qualitative health research (editor), 1992, Nelson Thornes; Sage, 1995
The illness experience: Dimensions of suffering (with J. Johnson), 1991, Sage 
Developing Grounded Theory: The Second Generation (coedited), 2009, Left Coast/Routledge; 2nd edition 2021, Routledge.
Completing a Qualitative Project: Details and Dialogue, 1997, Sage, selected as one of the best Health Science Books of 1997 by Doody's Rating Service
The nature of qualitative evidence, (with J. Swanson & A. Kuzel). 2001, Sage
Readme First for a User’s Guide to Qualitative Methods (with L. Richards), 2002, Sage; 2nd edition, 2007; 3rd edition 2012
Mixed-Method Design: Principles and Procedures (with L. Niehaus), 2009 Left Coast/Routledge
Qualitative Health Research: Creating a New Discipline, 2012, Left Coast/Routledge
Qualitatively-Driven Mixed-Method Designs, 2017, Left Coast/Routledge; 2nd edition 2018, Routledge
Analyzing and Conceptualizing the Theoretical Foundations of Nursing, 2017, Springer

Recognition 

Morse has been given lifetime achievement awards from the International Congress on Qualitative Inquiry (2011) and the International Institute for Qualitative Methodology (2019). She received the Episteme Award, Sigma Theta Tau, 1997. She was an inaugural inductee of Sigma Theta Tau International's Nurse Researcher Hall of Fame. She is a fellow of the American Academy of Nursing, American Anthropological Association, Society for Applied Anthropology, and Canadian Academy of Health Sciences.  Morse has honorary doctorates from University of Laval, Athabasca University (Canada) and University of Newcastle (Australia). She received the International Nursing Research Award from the American Nursing Association Council of Nurse Researcher in 1991.

Further reading 

 
 Interview with Cesar Cisneros-Puebla
 QHR Founding Editor Tribute Page - SAGE https://journals.sagepub.com/qhr/qhr-founding-editor-tribute-morse
 Porr, C. (2008). The scholarly work of Janice Morse: Synthesis and reflection. International Journal of Nursing Practice, 14(4), 265–272. doi:10.1111/j.1440-172X.2008.00692.x
 Foss, B., & Nåden, D. (2009). Janice Morse'Theory of Suffering—a Discussion in a Caring Science Perspective. Vård i Norden, 29(1), 14–18.
 Masson, V. (2008). The Science of Comforting. Nursing Education Perspectives, 29(2), 122. http://www.nln.org/nlnjournal/index.htm 
 https://journals.sagepub.com/qhr/qhr-founding-editor-tribute-morse. Includes open access to Morse editorials.
 Bottorff, J.L. (1990).  Comfort: Care + cure. [An interview with Janice Morse]. Aurora, 14 (3), 26–28. Available http://aurora.icaap.org/index.php/aurora/article/view/78/90 audio online: http://auspace.athabascau.ca:8080/dspace/bitstream/2149/1570/1/interview.mp3 May 8, 2008.

References

External links 

 Jan's website: www.janicemmorse.com
 Jan's Sage landing page: https://journals.sagepub.com/qhr/qhr-founding-editor-tribute-morse?pbEditor=true

People from Greymouth
New Zealand emigrants to the United States
1945 births
Living people
People educated at Greymouth High School